Dianna Marie Russini (born February 11, 1983) is an American sports journalist who currently works as an NFL host, reporter, insider, and analyst for ESPN on NFL Countdown and NFL Live. Russini joined ESPN and became a SportsCenter anchor in July 2015. Prior to being hired by ESPN, she worked as the main sports anchor for WRC-TV in Washington, D.C.

Born in The Bronx, Russini grew up in Norwood, New Jersey, and attended Northern Valley Regional High School at Old Tappan, where she was All State in soccer, basketball, softball and track. She played soccer for four seasons at George Mason University. In total, she scored seven goals and recorded one assist in 51 appearances for George Mason.

At the time she joined the network, she was the youngest reporter hired at WNBC in New York City as a reporter. She moved to sports soon after moving to Seattle as a reporter and anchor for CSN Northwest, having also worked for News 12 Westchester and NBC stations WRC-TV, WNBC, and WVIT. In July 2015, Russini joined ESPN after Disney executives saw her sportscast in DC. She served as a SportsCenter anchor and provided sideline reporting, with Tom Luginbill, for ESPN’s XFL Saturday afternoon games.

References

External links

1983 births
Living people
American people of Italian descent
American sports journalists
American women television journalists
ESPN people
American women's soccer players
Soccer players from New York (state)
Women's association football forwards
George Mason Patriots women's soccer players
National Football League announcers
Northern Valley Regional High School at Old Tappan alumni
People from Norwood, New Jersey
People from the Bronx
Sports commentators
XFL (2020) broadcasters
21st-century American journalists
21st-century American women